is the Japanese original academic degree given to people who had spent more than 4 years and successfully completed a particular specialized course of study at the vocational schools certified by Japanese MEXT (the educational ministry of the Japanese government). The vocational schools in this article mean a "senmon-gakkō" (専門学校) which means a professional training college and a "senshū-gakkō" (専修学校) which means a Specialized training college. This academic degree was established in 2005 to improve the graduates' reputation and to promote lifelong learning. Its level is equal to Bachelor given by the university.

Requirements
To spend more than 4 years.
To spend more than 3,400 lessons (equal to about 2,834 hours and 126 credits at a university) before graduation.
There is a proper system of education assigned by certified vocational schools.
To pass the examinations assigned by certified vocational schools.

See also
Diploma (Japan)

External links
The official leaflet published by MEXT (Japanese)
The 139th announce of MEXT (Japanese)

Academic degrees of Japan